The Salamander is a 1981 thriller film directed by Peter Zinner in his directorial debut. The film is based on a 1973 novel with the same name by Morris West.

Plot
Policeman Dante Matucci investigates a series of murders involving people in prominent positions. Left behind at each murder scene is a drawing of a salamander. As the body count grows he sees a pattern that might point to a neo-fascist conspiracy to take over the Italian government.

Cast 
Franco Nero as Carabinieri Colonel Dante Matucci 
Anthony Quinn as Bruno Manzini 
Martin Balsam as Captain Steffanelli 
Sybil Danning as Lili Anders 
Christopher Lee as Prince Baldasar, the Director of Counterintelligence 
Cleavon Little as Major Carl Malinowski, USMC
Paul L. Smith as The Surgeon
John Steiner as Captain Roditi 
Claudia Cardinale as Elena Leporello 
Eli Wallach as General Leporello 
Renzo Palmer as Carabinieri Major Giorgione 
Anita Strindberg as Princess Faubiani 
Marino Masé as Captain Rigoli 
Jacques Herlin as Woodpecker 
Fortunato Arena as General Pantaleone 
John Stacy as Concierge 
Gitte Lee as Princess Baldasar 
Nello Pazzafini as Manzini's Bodyguard

References

External links

1981 films
1981 directorial debut films
British political thriller films
1980s police films
1980s political thriller films
Films set in Italy
Films scored by Jerry Goldsmith
Films based on works by Morris West
ITC Entertainment films
Films produced by Paul Maslansky
Films with screenplays by Rod Serling
Films about murder
Films about coups d'état
1980s English-language films
1980s British films